Matthew Shasby is an American ice hockey coach and former player who is currently in charge of the program at Alaska Anchorage.

Career
An Alaska native, Shasby travelled south to finish out his junior hockey career and played two years in the USHL. He performed well enough to be selected by the Montreal Canadiens in the 1999 NHL Entry Draft. The following fall he returned to Alaska to play college hockey at Alaska Anchorage. While the Seawolves had a decent season during his freshman year, they finished near the bottom of the WCHA standings in 2001. After a new coach was introduced and Shasby was named an alternate captain, the Seawolves rebounded with a solid season. Shasby was named team captain in his senior season but the team went on to produce a horrible season. Alaska Anchorage won just a single game and finished with the worst record in program history. On top of the on-ice woes, 13 players were suspended for improperly using scholarship money for textbooks. Shasby, along with 10 other players, received 3-game suspensions.

After graduating, Shasby signed a professional contract and joined the Columbus Cottonmouths, the ECHL-affiliate of the Canadiens. He led the team in scoring by a defenseman and helped them finish with a winning record after a difficult start to the season. He was promoted to the AHL for the next year but went scoreless in 11 games with the Hamilton Bulldogs. He rediscovered his scoring touch with in the ECHL and helped the Long Beach Ice Dogs reach the second round of the playoffs.

Shasby left Montreal's system in 2005 and signed on with the Alaska Aces. He arrived just in time to help the Aces win the franchise's first ever championship. He played four years with the team and put up tremendous offensive numbers. Additionally, Shasby served as team captain for the 2008 season. He helped the Aces return to the finals in 2009 but the team fell to the South Carolina Stingrays in seven games. After the postseason, Shasby announced his retirement and began his coaching career. Three years later, he was brought out of retirement for a single game with the Aces and scored a goal in his final professional appearance.

Shasby remained in Alaska and coached several age groups and high school teams over many years. He rose through the ranks and became the vice president of player development for the state of Alaska. When Alaska Anchorage successfully raised enough money to restart their ice hockey program, they turned to Shasby as the team's head coach.

Career statistics

Regular season and playoffs

College Head coaching record

Awards and honors

References

External links
 

1980 births
Living people
People from Anchorage, Alaska
American men's ice hockey defensemen
Ice hockey people from Alaska
Ice hockey players from Alaska
Lincoln Stars players
Des Moines Buccaneers players
Alaska Anchorage Seawolves men's ice hockey players
Columbus Cottonmouths (ECHL) players
Hamilton Bulldogs (AHL) players
Long Beach Ice Dogs (ECHL) players
Alaska Aces (ECHL) players
Alaska Anchorage Seawolves men's ice hockey coaches
Montreal Canadiens draft picks